Stoutsburg is an unincorporated community located along the border of Hopewell Township in Mercer County and Montgomery Township in Somerset County, in the U.S. state of New Jersey. County Route 518 passes through the community from the east and west, while Province Line Road passes through north and south. Province Line Road follows the Keith line which formerly separated the provinces of West Jersey and East Jersey, now parts of Hopewell and Montgomery townships respectively.

History
On June 24, 1778, during the American Revolutionary War, General George Washington held a council of war at the Joseph Stout House (Hunt House) located here in preparation for the Battle of Monmouth.

References

Hopewell Township, Mercer County, New Jersey
Montgomery Township, New Jersey
Unincorporated communities in Mercer County, New Jersey
Unincorporated communities in Somerset County, New Jersey
Unincorporated communities in New Jersey